Lecaniodiscus is a genus of plants in the family Sapindaceae. It contains the following species (but this list may be incomplete):

 
Sapindaceae genera
Taxonomy articles created by Polbot